Alyaksandr Krakushyn (born 15 March 1991) is a retired Belarusian professional football player. He had to retire from professional football in late 2010 at the age of 19 due to health issues.

External links
Profile at teams.by

1991 births
Living people
Belarusian footballers
FC Torpedo-BelAZ Zhodino players
Association football goalkeepers